John Weir Foote,  (May 5, 1904 – May 2, 1988) was a Canadian military chaplain and politician. He received the Victoria Cross for his actions during the Dieppe Raid in 1942. Foote is the only Canadian chaplain to be awarded the Victoria Cross. After the war he was elected to the Legislative Assembly of Ontario and served as a Progressive Conservative member from 1948 to 1959. He represented the riding of Durham. He served as a cabinet minister in the government of Leslie Frost.

Early life 
Foote was born in Madoc in eastern Ontario on May 5, 1904. He was educated at the University of Western Ontario in London, Ontario, at Queen's University in Kingston, Ontario and at Presbyterian College and McGill University in Montreal, Quebec. He entered the Presbyterian ministry in 1934, serving congregations in Fort-Coulonge, Quebec, and Port Hope, Ontario.

In 1934 it is recorded that Rev. John Weir Foote joined the Loyal Orange Association, being initiated into Fraserville Loyal Orange Lodge No. 46, Ontario.

In December 1939, after the outbreak of the Second World War, he enlisted in the Canadian Army. He was posted to The Royal Hamilton Light Infantry (Wentworth Regiment) (RHLI) as the Regimental Chaplain with the rank of Honorary Captain.

Victoria Cross 
Foote was 38 years old and serving as the padre of the RHLI, when he performed the following deed during the Dieppe Raid for which he was awarded the Victoria Cross:

On August 19, 1942 at Dieppe, France, Captain Foote coolly and calmly during the eight hours of the battle walked about collecting the wounded and carry them to safety. His gallant actions saved many lives and inspired those around him by his example. At the end of this gruelling time he climbed from the landing craft that was to have taken him to safety and deliberately walked into the German position in order to be taken prisoner so that he could be of help to those men who would be in captivity until May 5, 1945.

His VC award was gazetted after the Second World War on February 14, 1946, the citation read:

He later achieved the rank of Major and he remained with the Royal Canadian Army Chaplain Corps at Camp Borden until being demobilized in 1948.

Politics 

He won a seat in the Legislative Assembly of Ontario in the 1948 provincial election and served as the Progressive Conservative Member of Provincial Parliament (MPP) for Durham. He was first appointed to serve as Deputy Commissioner for the Liquor Control Board of Ontario, then into the cabinet after the 1951 election as Ontario Minister of Reform Institutions, but stepped down in 1957, following a number of heart attacks. He retired from the provincial legislature in 1959.

Cabinet positions

Later life 
Foote returned to the RHLI in 1964, serving as Honorary Lieutenant-Colonel until 1973.

He made his home with his wife, the former Edith Sheridan (1898–1986), in Cobourg, Ontario, until his death on May 2, 1988. He is buried in Union Cemetery, Cobourg.

Legacy 

The Royal Canadian Legion branch in Grafton, Ontario was renamed the Lt. Col. John W Foote V.C. C.D Branch 580 in 1982.

The James Street Armoury in Hamilton, Ontario, where the RHLI is now based, along with The Argyll & Sutherland Highlanders of Canada (Princess Louise's) and 11 Field Regiment, Royal Canadian Artillery, was renamed the John W. Foote VC Armoury in his memory. Prior to his death, John Foote donated his medals to the Royal Hamilton Light Infantry where they are held at the RHLI Heritage Museum at the John W Foote VC Armoury. The Armoury is a Classified Federal Heritage Building 1986 on the Register of the Government of Canada Heritage Buildings.

Honours

See also 
 Monuments to Courage (David Harvey, 1999)
 The Register of the Victoria Cross (This England, 1997)

References

External links 
 Canadian Government website biography and citation: FOOTE, John Weir
 The Royal Hamilton Light Infantry – John W Foote VC Armoury, Hamilton Ontario

1904 births
1988 deaths
Canadian clergy
Canadian World War II recipients of the Victoria Cross
World War II chaplains
Royal Hamilton Light Infantry (Wentworth Regiment)
Royal Hamilton Light Infantry (Wentworth Regiment) officers
Canadian Presbyterian ministers
Progressive Conservative Party of Ontario MPPs
Queen's University at Kingston alumni
People from Hastings County
University of Western Ontario alumni
McGill University alumni
Canadian military chaplains
Canadian Army officers
Canadian Army personnel of World War II
Canadian military personnel from Ontario